The 1950 United States Senate election in Pennsylvania was held on November 7, 1950. Incumbent Democratic U.S. Senator Francis J. Myers sought re-election, but was defeated by Republican nominee James H. Duff. As of 2021, this is the last time that Lycoming County voted Democratic in a Senate election.

General election

Candidates
Earl N. Bergerstock (Prohibition)
James H. Duff, Governor of Pennsylvania (Republican)
Frank Knotek (Socialist Labor)
Francis J. Myers, incumbent U.S. Senator (Democratic)
Lillian R. Narins, peace activist (Progressive)
Jack Still (GIs Against Communism)
Clyde A. Turner (Militant Workers)
William J. Van Essen (Socialist)

Results

References

1950
Pennsylvania
United States Senate